The 2014–15 FC Krylia Sovetov Samara season was the club's first season back in the National Football League following their relegation in 2014. They also played in the Russian Cup.

Squad

Transfers

Summer

In:

Out:

Winter

In:

Out:

Friendlies

FNL Cup

Final series

Competitions

Russian National Football League

Results by round

Matches

League table

Russian Cup

Squad statistics

Appearances and goals

|-
|colspan="14"|Players away from the club on loan:

|-
|colspan="14"|Players who appeared for Anzhi Makhachkala that left during the season:

|}

Goal scorers

Disciplinary record

Notes
Notes
 MSK time changed from UTC+4 to UTC+3 permanently on 26 October 2014.

References

External links
Official website 
Official website 

PFC Krylia Sovetov Samara seasons
Krylia Sovetov